Zucchini slice is a dish common in Australia and New Zealand that bears similarities to frittatas and quick breads. It consists of zucchini, eggs, cheese, usually bacon, and flour baked to form a flat loaf. It is baked in a flat loaf, cut into squares, and served as a main dish or a side dish and is often eaten for lunch.

It is one of a category of similarly-named and -served dishes common in the region, both sweet and savory.

History 
In Australia and New Zealand the dish is a "beloved lunchbox staple or café snack", according to the New York Times. It is one of a category of slices, both sweet and savory, common in the region. 

The dish may have roots in Europe or the Middle East.

Description 
The New York Times calls it "a cross between a frittata and savory quick bread". The main flavors are of egg and cheese.

Ingredients, preparation, and serving 
The dish combines zucchini, eggs, cheese, flour, and usually bacon, along with seasonings and sometimes other ingredients.

The dish takes approximately an hour to produce. The zucchini is grated and combined with the other ingredients into a thick batter and baked until firm, typically in a Lamington pan. It is served in flat slices, usually warm or at room temperature, and eaten out of hand. It can also be served hot.

The dish is typically eaten as an entree or a side dish.

Popularity 
The dish is a staple in Australia and New Zealand; Australian Women's Weekly introduces their version with the phrase "No introduction needed" and named it to their 2003 list of six "all time reader favourite meals". According to Taste.com.au, it is their most popular recipe. Magic Little Meals refers to it as "a favorite with young and old". According to More it is perennially at the top of online search lists during zucchini season in Australia.

Similar dishes 
Dishes similar to the category of slices include bar cookies, frittatas, and sheet cakes. The zucchini slice is most similar to a frittata, although the inclusion of flour makes it according to Lukas Volger similar in texture to "somewhere between a quiche and a savory muffin".

See also 

 Mucver
 Vanilla slice

References 

Australian cuisine
New Zealand cuisine
Squash and pumpkin dishes
Egg dishes
Cheese dishes